Events from the year 1860 in Ireland.

Events
25 February – £11,000 collected at church doors in Dublin to finance the Pope's defence against the Risorgimento in Italy; £80,000 collected nationwide (the equivalent of several millions of modern-day Euros).  
28 August – Landlord and Tenant Law Amendment (Ireland) Act 1860 ("Deasy's Land Act"), intended to reform tenants' rights.
September – Myles O'Reilly's "Battalion of St Patrick" assist in the unsuccessful defence of Spoleto against the Risorgimento. 
3 November – The Catholic Ballaghaderreen Cathedral is consecrated and opened.
11 November – Kildare Street Club, Dublin, destroyed by fire.
21–23 November – Partry evictions, County Mayo: 68 families turned out of their houses by Thomas Plunket, Church of Ireland Bishop of Tuam.
Construction begins on the Roman Catholic church that will become St Peter's Cathedral, Belfast.

Arts and literature
27 March – the melodrama The Colleen Bawn, or The Brides of Garryowen, written by and starring Dion Boucicault, is first performed at Laura Keene's Theatre, New York.
Dr. George Sigerson's The Poets and Poetry of Munster is published.
Anthony Trollope's novel Castle Richmond, set during the Great Famine, is completed and published in England.

Births
1 January – John Cassidy, sculptor and painter (died 1939).
17 January – Douglas Hyde, member of the Seanad in 1922 and 1938; first President of Ireland and Gaelic scholar (died 1949).
1 June – Hugh Thomson, illustrator (died 1920).
8 June – Alicia Boole Stott, mathematician (died 1940).
25 June – John Danaher, soldier, recipient of the Victoria Cross for gallantry in 1881 near Pretoria, South Africa (died 1919).
23 July – Thomas Preston, scientist (died 1900).
8 December – Amanda McKittrick Ros, born Anna McKittrick, novelist and poet noted for her purple prose (died 1939).
25 December – Patrick S. Dinneen, lexicographer and historian (died 1934).

Deaths
12 February – William Francis Patrick Napier, soldier and military historian (born 1785).
17 March – Anna Brownell Jameson, writer (born 1794).
23 October – Peter Boyle de Blaquière, politician in Canada and first chancellor of the University of Toronto (born 1783).
24 November – George Croly, poet, novelist, historian and divine (born 1780)

References

 
1860s in Ireland
Years of the 19th century in Ireland
Ireland
 Ireland